Tarpeena is a town and a locality on the Riddoch Highway between Penola and Mount Gambier in the Limestone Coast region of South Australia.

The 2016 Australian census which was conducted in August 2016 reports that Tarpeena had a population of 414 of which 337 lived in its town centre.

The town was named by Governor MacDonnell, after the aboriginal words tart pena which means red gum tree. The town was surveyed in October 1860. Boundaries for the locality were created on 25 February 1999.

Industry
Pastoralists entered the area in the 1840s and soon established sheep stations for wool. With the improvement in transport and the road system Tarpeena has become largely a dormitory suburb of the regional centre of Mount Gambier but the timber mill is still a valuable part of the infrastructure and helps the post office remain viable with the trade generated from over 700 employees.

Governance
Tarpeena is located within the federal division of Barker, the state electoral district of Mount Gambier and the local government area of the District Council of Grant.

Education
After 106 years, the primary school in Tarpeena closed in 2011 due to diminished enrolment.

References

External links
The Local School website

Towns in South Australia
Limestone Coast